The Class 91 is a type of electric multiple unit currently operating on Keretapi Tanah Melayu's Electric Train Service (ETS) since 2009. KTMB purchased a total of 5 sets worth RM 240 million from a joint venture between South Korea's Rotem Co. and Japan Mitsubishi Electric Corp in 2008. Each set has six coaches.

All five train sets were designed by the Marubeni Corporation, but were built by Hyundai Rotem of Korea and Mitsubishi Electric of Japan. The design of the train sets follows very closely the IE 22000 Class of Ireland's InterCity trains. The major difference between the trainsets in Ireland and those used in Malaysia is that the Irish trainsets are diesel operate and on a broad gauge rail (1,600mm) while Malaysia has a metre gauge (1,000mm) system and electrically powered.

Operation
The class 91 operates in a fixed 6-cars configuration. Currently, class 91 sets are mainly used for long distance intercity travel. In 2010–2012, 2 sets of KTM class 91 were being used for normal commuter use due to a shortage of trains. While in commuter use, long distance facilities such as toilets and cafes were closed and locked.

Speed is limited partially by the use of narrow gauge.

Train schedule is categorically separated into a number of fixed classes with different ticketing structure afforded to travelling at particular times. i.e. travelling during peak would incur premium ticket cost whereas travel during off-peak mid day incur a discounted fare.

On-board service 
All six cars have standard class only. The seats are arranged in a 2+2 fashion and each seat comes with a tray table and a power outlet. The seats can be easily converted for wheelchair use should the need arise. The seats use red seat covers. There is an LCD TV in every coach for entertainment and toilets are available in every coach. For Muslim passengers, there is a prayer room in every train. There is a bistro coach which sells drinks, light snacks and microwaved meals.

Maintenance
The Class 91 is stabled and maintained at Batu Gajah Rail Depot in Perak.

Features
The Class 91 is one of the first trains in KTMs inventory to feature onboard displays displaying current speed. Train seating is optimised for long distance seating with minimal standing space. Fixed large seats are placed traverse throughout the coach. LCD Displays within coach show feature films, with sound muted but with subtitled English.
During long distance operations, as many as 7 attendants will attend the train set.

Expansion
In the future, there are plans for an additional 20 sets.

However, there are none currently being ordered. Recent orders suggest a different rail class to be introduced. The second generation ETS KTM class 93 has been introduced to further expand the ETS fleet size.

Formation

Accidents and Incidents 
One ETS Train, ETS104, crashed with an Ekspres Rakyat train at KM322 on 7 May 2016 at 1.40pm. Three passengers were injured and all passengers were safely evacuated. The train was heavily damaged at the front end and withdrawn from service.

Gallery

References

KTM ETS
Marubeni
Multiple units of Malaysia
25 kV AC multiple units
Hyundai Rotem multiple units